George Rogers (January 29, 1856 – August 11, 1901) was a miller, grain merchant and political figure in Manitoba. He represented Norfolk from 1896 to 1899 in the Legislative Assembly of Manitoba as a Liberal.

Background
Born in Tottenham, Canada West, Rogers was the son of Stephen Rogers, a United Empire Loyalist, and was educated there and at Pickering College. Rogers served on the Carberry school board. In 1884, he married Maggie Bride. He died in 1901.

References 

1856 births
1901 deaths
Manitoba Liberal Party MLAs
Canadian Quakers